Sodium arsenite usually refers to the  inorganic compound with the formula NaAsO2. Also called sodium meta-arsenite, it is the sodium salt of arsenous acid. Sodium ortho-arsenite is Na3AsO3. The compounds are colourless solids.

Synthesis and structure
A mixture of sodium meta-arsenite and sodium ortho-arsenite is produced by treating arsenic trioxide with sodium carbonate or sodium hydroxide. Sodium arsenite is amorphous, typically being obtained as a powder or as a glassy mass.  The compound consists of the polymer [AsO2] associated with sodium cations, Na+.  The polymer backbone has the connectivity -O-As(O−)-.

Health effects
Sodium arsenite can be inhaled or absorbed through the skin. Along with its known carcinogenic and teratogenic effects, contact with the substance can yield symptoms such as skin irritation, burns, itching, thickened skin, rash, loss of pigment, poor appetite, a metallic or garlic taste, stomach pain, nausea, vomiting, diarrhea, convulsions, decreased blood pressure, and headache. Severe acute poisoning may lead to nervous system damage resulting in weakness, poor coordination, or “pins and needles” sensations, eventual paralysis, and death.

Application
It is primarily used as a pesticide, but has other uses such as hide preservative, antiseptic, dyeing, and soaps.

Sodium arsenite is an appropriate chemical stressor to induce the production of heat shock proteins, and the formation of cytoplasmic stress granules.

Sodium arsenite can be used as a reducing agent in organic chemistry, as it is able to reduce a trihaloalkane to a dihaloalkane:
CHBr3 + Na3AsO3 + NaOH → CH2Br2 + Na3AsO4 + NaBr

Safety
The LD50 (oral, mouse) is 40 mg/kg.

References

Arsenites
Sodium compounds